The Comedy Mill was a Canadian sketch comedy television series, which aired from 1987 to 1991 on Hamilton, Ontario's CHCH-TV, and through syndication on other Canadian television stations. The show starred the husband and wife comedy duo of Steve Smith and Morag Smith, with a supporting cast that included Peter Keleghan, Linda Kash and Mag Ruffman.

The show was a revival of their earlier Smith & Smith series, which ended in 1985. For the 85-86 television season, the Smiths and their children Max and David starred in the family sitcom Me & Max.

One of the show's regular features involved parody music videos, presented by Kash as a caricature of a television VJ. Some of the parody videos even made it into rotation on MuchMusic and The Nashville Network.

After The Comedy Mill ended its run, Morag retired from performing and Steve launched his most famous series, The Red Green Show. Red Green had appeared as a recurring character on all of the duo's earlier shows, including The Comedy Mill.

References

External links 
 

First-run syndicated television shows in Canada
1987 Canadian television series debuts
1991 Canadian television series endings
Television series by S&S Productions
Television shows filmed in Hamilton, Ontario
1980s Canadian sketch comedy television series
1990s Canadian sketch comedy television series